Bernard Raymond E. Hall (born 8 July 1942) is a former professional footballer who played as a goalkeeper in The Football League for Bristol Rovers.

Hall was born in Bath, and played for Twerton Youth Club before joining Bristol Rovers as a junior in 1958. A year later he turned professional at the age of seventeen, but it was a further three and a half years before he finally made his League debut, on 20 April 1962 against Charlton Athletic. He finally established himself as first choice between the sticks after the then incumbent 'keeper Esmond Million received a lifetime ban from football in 1963 for accepting a bribe to throw a game against Bradford Park Avenue.

Following the Million scandal, Hall then played in Rovers' next 134 consecutive games in all competitions. In total he played 163 League games for Rovers before having his career prematurely ended on 31 December 1966 at the age of 24. On that day he challenged Middlesbrough forward John O'Rourke for the ball, but the pair collided so severely that it knocked Hall out and left him in a coma in Frenchay Hospital for sixteen days. Although he recovered from this incident sufficiently to live a normal life, he was unable to resume his football career. He later took as job as the groundsman of the Imperial Sports Ground in Knowle, Bristol.

Career stats
The table below shows Bernard Hall's Football League record for the duration of his professional career.

References

1942 births
Living people
Sportspeople from Bath, Somerset
English footballers
Association football goalkeepers
English Football League players
Bristol Rovers F.C. players